Sankt Margareten im Rosental (Slovene: Šmarjeta v Rožu) is a town in the district of Klagenfurt-Land in the Austrian state of Carinthia.

Geography
The municipality lies in the southeast Rosental at the foot of the Hochobir. On the north, the Drau forms the municipal boundary, on the east the Freibach, and on the south and the west tributaries of the Karawank and the Inzegraben.

Population
According to the 2001 census 11,8% of the population are Carinthian Slovenes.

Notable people 
 Karl Matthäus Woschitz (b. 1937), theologian and bible scholar

District Klagenfurt Land

References

Cities and towns in Klagenfurt-Land District